Yashwantrao Chavan became the chief minister of the Bombay State on 1 November 1956. The first Chavan ministry served until 1957 Bombay Legislative Assembly election, and was succeeded by Chavan's second ministry.

Ministry
The ministry consisted of 15 cabinet ministers.

References

Indian National Congress
C
C
Cabinets established in 1956
Cabinets disestablished in 1957
Bombay State